Strzała  is a village in the administrative district of Gmina Siedlce, within Siedlce County, Masovian Voivodeship, in east-central Poland.

According to documents of Łuków county from 1552, Strzała was the gentry village and was included in the Siedlce wealth of Ogiński's princes.

The village has a population of 1,054.

References

Villages in Siedlce County